Jan Kacper Bednarek (born 12 April 1996) is a Polish professional footballer who plays as a centre-back for  club Southampton and the Poland national team.

Club career

Lech Poznań
In 2013, Bednarek made his Ekstraklasa debut, at the age of 17 years old, for Lech Poznań against Piast Gliwice, in an eventual 2–0 win for the home side. The Polish under-21 international became an integral member of the squad, featuring 31 times and scoring once as Poznań narrowly missed out on the Polish Cup to Arka Gdynia 2–1 after extra time.

Górnik Łęczna (loan)
He was loaned to Górnik Łęczna for the 2015–16 season, where he managed a total of 17 league appearances before returning to his parent club.

Southampton

2017–18 season 
On 1 July 2017, Bednarek joined Southampton on a five-year deal, for a reported fee of £5 million. On 23 August 2017, Bednarek made his debut for Southampton against Wolves in the EFL Cup which ended in a 2–0 defeat. Bednarek did not feature again until 8 January 2018 in a FA Cup match against Fulham which ended in a 1–0 victory before being substituted for Maya Yoshida in the second half. Bednarek played out of position at right-back during the game, but was able to help keep a clean sheet.

Virgil Van Dijk left in January, and Mauricio Pellegrino was replaced by Mark Hughes who switched to a back three in April. He made his Premier League debut on 14 April 2018 against Chelsea, and scored Southampton’s second goal in a 3–2 defeat. Bednarek ended the season with five league appearances and eight in all competitions.

2018–19 season 
On 28 August 2018, Bednarek made his first appearance of the season in the EFL Cup against Brighton which ended in a 1–0 victory. On 22 September 2018, Bednarek made his first Premier League appearance of the season against Liverpool which ended in a 3–0 defeat after replacing Oriol Romeu in the second half. On 3 December 2018, Mark Hughes was sacked by Southampton. Under Hughes, Bednarek only made two league appearances so far that season. The arrival of Ralph Hasenhüttl saw a change in fortune for Bednarek, who ended the season with 25 league appearances.

2019–20 season 
On 10 August 2019, Bednarek made his first appearance of the season in the league in a 3–0 defeat against Burnley. On 25 October 2019, Bednarek featured in Southampton’s 0–9 defeat to Leicester. On 28 January 2020, Bednarek scored his first and only goal of the season in a 3–2 defeat to Wolves. Following Southampton’s 1–0 defeat against Newcastle on 7 March 2020, English football was suspended due to the COVID-19 pandemic. 

Southampton and Bednarek would not play again until 19 June 2020 against Norwich which ended in a 3–0 victory. Bednarek ended the season with 39 appearances in all competitions.

2020–21 season 
On 12 September 2020, Bednarek made his first appearance of the season in the league in a 1–0 defeat to Crystal Palace. On 6 November 2020, Bednarek featured in Southampton’s 2–0 win over Newcastle which saw ‘the Saints’  go top of the English top flight for the first time since 1988. His only goal of the season came during a 3–2 defeat to Manchester United on 29 November 2020. On 3 December 2020, Bednarek signed a new four-and-a-half year contract. 

On 2 February 2021, Bednarek scored an own goal, conceded a penalty and was given a red card after a foul on Anthony Martial in his team's record-equalling 9–0 defeat to Manchester United after Mike Dean checked the pitchside monitor. Despite this, the red card was controversial and Manchester United manager Ole Gunnar Solskjær believed that Bednarek should not have been sent off. The red card issued was subsequently rescinded following an appeal by the club. 

Bednarek ended the season with 41 appearances in all competitions.

2021–22 season 
On 22 August 2021, Bednarek made his first appearance of the season in a 1–1 draw against Manchester United after replacing Theo Walcott at half time. Three days later, Bednarek made his first start of the season in a narrow 0–8 victory in the EFL Cup against Newport City, which is Southampton’s biggest away win in their history. On 18 September 2021, after not starting the opening four games, Bednarek made his first league start of the season in a 0–0 draw with Manchester City. In that game, Southampton defender Jack Stephens had played every minute in all competitions up until he suffered a knee injury. Following the injury to Stephens, Bednarek returned to being a regular starter.

On 1 December 2021, Bednarek scored his first league goal of the season in a 2–2 draw against Leicester City. On 26 December 2021, Bednarek scored his second goal in three games after he netted the winner in Southampton’s 2–3 victory against West Ham. On 11 January 2022, Bednarek scored again in Southampton’s 4–1 victory against Brentford. On 16 April 2022, Bednarek’s final goal of the season came in a 1–0 victory against Arsenal, which took his total goals for the season to four and he ended the season with 34 appearances in all competitions.

2022–23 season: Loan to Aston Villa 
On 1 September 2022, Bednarek joined Aston Villa on a season-long loan. The loan was ended early on 23 January 2023 as Bednarek was recalled to Southampton.

International career

On 4 September 2017, Bednarek made his international debut for Poland in a 3–0 victory over Kazakhstan.

In May 2018, he was named in Poland’s preliminary 35-man squad for the 2018 World Cup in Russia.

On 28 June 2018, he scored his first goal for Poland, the only goal in a 1–0 victory over Japan at the World Cup.

Personal life 
His brother Filip is also a footballer, who currently plays as a goalkeeper for the Polish club Lech Poznań.

Career statistics

Club

International

Poland score listed first, score column indicates score after each Bednarek goal.

References

External links

Profile at Southampton F.C. website

1996 births
Living people
People from Słupca County
Sportspeople from Greater Poland Voivodeship
Polish footballers
Poland international footballers
Association football defenders
Lech Poznań II players
Lech Poznań players
Górnik Łęczna players
Southampton F.C. players
Aston Villa F.C. players
III liga players
Ekstraklasa players
Premier League players
2018 FIFA World Cup players
UEFA Euro 2020 players
2022 FIFA World Cup players
Polish expatriate footballers
Expatriate footballers in England
Polish expatriate sportspeople in England